Urban Priol (born 14 May 1961) is a German Kabarett artist and comedian.

Life
Urban Priol was born on 14 May 1961, in Aschaffenburg. He spent his childhood in Obernburg am Main. In 1980, he made his abitur at the Kronberg-Gymnasium Aschaffenburg. After his studies at the Würzburg University he began teacher training with the subjects of English, Russian and history, but he did not finish In 1988 he was co-founder (artistic director) of the ‘’Kleinkunstbühne Obernburg’’. Since 1998, he is the owner of the Kabarett im Hofgarten. Since May 2009 Priol is a member of the globalization-critical network Attac.

Cabaret
Priol made his first stage performances  already in 1982. In his first own TV show Everything Must Go (3sat, 2004–2007), he offered a stage for three to four guests from the cabaret scene.
On 3 August 2006, a 45-minute excerpt from Priols program daily fresh as part of the series  summer solo  was broadcast by the ZDF. Besides Priols program the ZDF presented among others Rüdiger Hoffmann, Bülent Ceylan and Eckart von Hirschhausen.

Neues aus der Anstalt
Priol presented the political cabaret program Neues aus der Anstalt for nearly seven years.  The show premiered in January 2007 and was co-hosted by Georg Schramm until June 2010. Schramm was replaced by Frank-Markus Barwasser alias Erwin Pelzig. On 26 June 2013 Priol and Barwasser announced their withdrawal from the program.

Awards 
 2007: Deutscher Fernsehpreis for Neues aus der Anstalt, together with Georg Schramm
 2013: Das große Kleinkunstfestival Berlin-Preis

External links

References

German cabaret performers
1961 births
German television presenters
German male comedians
Living people
ZDF people